Achille Accili (19 October 1921 – 14 October 2007) was an Italian politician for the Christian Democrats.

Biography 
Accili was born on 19 October 1921 in Acciano. Prior to his political career, Accili was a primary school teacher. He was the mayor of his hometown before serving in the Senate.

Accili would serve in the Italian Senate from 1968 to 1987. While serving there, he became a leader of the left leaning component of the Christian Democrats alongside Luciano Fabiani.

Accili was the state secretary for transport within the Andreotti IV Cabinet. 

Achille Accili died on 14 October 2007, in Rome.

Family 
Accili was married to Maria Castellani. The couple had four children, and their eldest daughter is the diplomat Maria Assunta Accili Sabbatini. His son, Domenico Accili, moved to the United States and became a professor at Columbia University.

External links 

 Italian Senate Page

References

1921 births
2007 deaths
Senators of Legislature V of Italy
Senators of Legislature VI of Italy
Senators of Legislature VII of Italy
Senators of Legislature VIII of Italy
Senators of Legislature IX of Italy
Mayors of places in Abruzzo
Italian schoolteachers
20th-century Italian educators
Acciano